Nice Girls Don't Stay for Breakfast is an LP album by Julie London, released by Liberty Records under catalog number LRP-3493 as a monophonic recording and catalog number LST-7493 in stereo in 1967. The song arrangements were by Don Bagley.

Track listing
"Nice Girls Don't Stay for Breakfast" (Jerome J. Leshay, Bobby Troup)  2:25           
"When I Grow Too Old to Dream" (Sigmund Romberg, Oscar Hammerstein II)  2:52           
"I've Got a Crush on You" (George Gershwin, with lyrics by Ira Gershwin)  2:13           
"Everything I Have Is Yours" (Burton Lane, Harold Adamson)  3:05           
"You Made Me Love You" (James V. Monaco, Joseph McCarthy)  2:18           
"Baby Won't You Please Come Home" (Charles Warfield, Clarence Williams)  2:11           
"I Didn't Know What Time It Was"  (Richard Rodgers, Lorenz Hart)  2:50           
"Give a Little Whistle" (Leigh Harline, Ned Washington)  3:06           
"I Surrender, Dear" (Harry Barris, Gordon Clifford)  3:40           
"You Go to My Head" (J. Fred Coots, Haven Gillespie)  3:07           
"There Will Never Be Another You" (Harry Warren, Mack Gordon)  3:16           
"Mickey Mouse March" (Jimmie Dodd)  2:08

Personnel
 Julie London - vocals
 Bob Cooper - tenor saxophone
 Jack Sheldon - trumpet
 John Gray - guitar
 Don Bagley - double bass, arranger

References

Liberty Records albums
1967 albums
Julie London albums